Sumène is a commune in the Gard department in southern France.

Geography

Climate

Sumène has a hot-summer Mediterranean climate (Köppen climate classification Csa) closely bordering on a warm-summer Mediterranean climate (Csb).

Population

See also
Communes of the Gard department

References

Communes of Gard